Horațiu Răzvan Covaci (born 10 October 2003) is a Romanian professional footballer who plays as a right midfielder for Liga I club FC Argeș Pitești.

References

External links
 
 

2003 births
People from Luduș
Living people
Romanian footballers
Romania youth international footballers
Association football midfielders
Liga I players
CS Gaz Metan Mediaș players
FC Argeș Pitești players